Internal affairs may refer to:

Government and law
 The domestic policy of a sovereign state
 Ministry of home affairs, a common type of government department
 Ministry of Internal Affairs
 Department of Internal Affairs, New Zealand
 Directorate for Internal Affairs (Jewish Autonomous Oblast), Russia
 Internal affairs (law enforcement), a division of a law enforcement agency which investigates cases of police misconduct
 Internal affairs doctrine, a choice of law rule in corporations law

Arts and entertainment
 Internal Affairs (film), a 1990 American crime thriller
 Internal Affairs, a 1988 TV film with Richard Crenna
 Internal Affairs (Family Guy), a 2012 episode 
 "Internal Affairs", an episode of T.U.F.F. Puppy
 "Internal Affairs", an episode of Aaahh!!! Real Monsters
 Internal Affairs (Pharoahe Monch album), 1999
 Internal Affairs (The Night Flight Orchestra album), 2012

See also
 
 Home Affairs (disambiguation)
 IA (disambiguation)
 Internal (disambiguation)
 Affair (disambiguation)
 State (polity)
 National Academy of Internal Affairs, Ukraine